"Crocebacterium ilecola" is a Gram-positive, non-spore-forming and motile species of bacteria from the family of Microbacteriaceae. "Crocebacterium ilecola" has been isolated from the hindgut of the larva Tipula abdominalis from United States.

References

Microbacteriaceae
Bacteria described in 2010
Monotypic bacteria genera